Akshit Sukhija (born 18 November 1996) is an Indian actor who is best known as Raja Reshammiya in Shubharambh and now notably as Dr. Ishaan Tandon in Fanaa: Ishq Mein Marjawan.

Early life
Akshit Sukhija was born on 18 November 1997 in Punjab, India. In 2003, he shifted to New Delhi and completed his schooling. Later, he pursued a course of journalism from Vivekananda Institute of Professional Studies (VIPS), New Delhi.

Career
In 2018, Sukhija shifted to Mumbai to pursue his career in acting and began his career as a  model. Sukhija made his acting debut as Arnav Shukhla in March 2019 with Voot web-series, Silsila Badalte Rishton Ka Season 2 opposite Aneri Vajani.

In December 2019, he got his first lead role as Raja Reshammiya in Colors TV show Shubh Aarambh. In January 2022, Sukhija is seen as an oncologist named Ishaan Tandon in Gul Khan's Fanaa: Ishq Mein Marjawan opposite Reem Shaikh. In July 2022, he quit the show.

Filmography

Television

Special appearances

Web series

See also 
 List of Indian actors
 List of Indian television actors

References

External links 
 

Living people
Indian television actors
Indian male soap opera actors
21st-century Indian male actors
Indian male models
Indian male television actors
Male actors in Hindi television
People from Delhi
Actors from Delhi
1997 births